Lioptilodes alolepidodactylus is a species of moth in the genus Lioptilodes known from Argentina and Chile. Moths of this species take flight from October to December and have a wingspan of 23-25 millimetres.

References

Platyptiliini
Moths described in 1991
Taxa named by Cees Gielis